Templar Studios LLC is an American independent game development company, formed in 1997 by Peter Mack and several associates to create video games for clients looking to market products and services on the Internet, which in turn would fund internal development of proprietary titles. The company was originally located on the Lower East Side, but moved its offices to Chinatown in 2003. Templar continues to be managed by Peter Mack (President & Creative Director), Gordon Klimes (Animation Director), and Justin Luchter (Senior Audio Designer).

Templar and LEGO 
For many years, The LEGO Company was Templar's largest client. Templar produced a number of video games and specialized content for LEGO beginning with the Mindstorms product line in 1997/1998. In 2000, Templar began working with LEGO on a new concept in online gaming for LEGO's Bionicle toy line. Templar designed and produced a large-scale Flash-based adventure game entitled Mata Nui Online Game, with chapters introducing the various characters. Each chapter was added to the online game as LEGO released new toys in the product line. The online game received millions of visitors and Bionicle became one of the best-selling action figures in 2001. Templar produced several additions to the site for LEGO between 2001 and 2003. In 2003, Templar produced a next-generation sequel for the Bionicle line entitled The Final Chronicle.

Other clients and projects 
Templar also produces PC and web games for other clients such as 20th Century Fox, Universal, Cartoon Network, Nickelodeon, Office Max, Slim Jim, and Volkswagen. The company has won several industry awards, including a nomination for Mata Nui at the 2003 Flash Forward Festival, and a Golden Lion award by the International Advertising Festival in Cannes, for its work with Volkswagen.

Television: 
BBC America (Footballers Wives)
Cartoon Network (Ed, Edd n Eddy, Codename: Kids Next Door, BoBoBo-Bo)
HBO (The Sopranos)
Movie Studios: 
20th Century Fox (Transporter 2,Pathfinder: Legend of the Ghost Warrior) 
Lions Gate (Lord of War) 
Sony Pictures (Triple X 2: State of the Union) 
Warner Bros. (Yu-Gi-Oh!)''
Advertising Agency & clients: 
Arnold Worldwide: Truth Campaign
Bartle Bogle Hegarty: Axe Shower Gel
Crispin Porter + Bogusky: Gateway Computers, Geeksquad, Slim Jim, Volkswagen, Virgin Atlantic

External links
 Templar
 Bionicle Site

Video game development companies
Video game companies of the United States
Video game companies established in 1997